Mogford is a surname. Notable people with the surname include:

John Mogford (1821–1885), British painter
Steve Mogford (born 1956), British businessman
Thomas Mogford (born 1977), British author
Thomas Mogford (1809–1868), British painter

See also
Mugford (disambiguation)